Haider Ali (born 12 November 1979) is a Pakistani retired professional boxer who fought in the featherweight division. He is a Commonwealth Games gold medalist and an Olympian.

Early life and amateur career 
Haider started boxing at an early age, having decided to become a boxer after watching fellow countryman Hussain Shah win a bronze medal at the 1988 Summer Olympics in Seoul.

Haider became the National Champion in 1998 whist winning gold medals in the Green Hill International Boxing Tournament held at Karachi in 1998 and the Imam Khomeini International Boxing Tournament held in Iran in 1999.

Additionally, Haider won a bronze medal in the 1998 Asian Games held in Bangkok, losing in the semi-finals to Indonesia's Hermensen Ballo.

Representing Pakistan, Haider won a gold medal in the featherweight division in 1999 South Asian Games.

Haider Ali qualified for the 2000 Summer Olympics in Sydney but was defeated 5-4 by 1992 Summer Olympics bronze-medallist Ramazan Palyani in the Round of 32.

Haider won a bronze medal at the 24th Kings Cup boxing tournament in Bangkok being defeated by Thailand's Suttisak Samaksaman 7-3 in the semi-finals.

In 2002, Haider Ali defeated Thailand's Suttisak Samaksaman in the finals to win the gold medal in the Asian Championships which were held in Malaysia. He received the award of 'The Best Boxer of the Tournament' for the Asian Championships.

Haider won Pakistan's first gold medal in the any Commonwealth Games by defeating India's Som Bahadur Pun by a margin of 28-10 in a four-round final in the featherweight division of 2002 Commonwealth Games which was held in Manchester.

Following his victory in the 2002 Commonwealth Games, Haider received the Order of Merit from the government of Pakistan along with gifts such as a Jeep, house as well as a golden Kalashnikov rifle.

Pro career 
In 2003, Haider moved to Leyton in East London and signed Frank Warren as his manager and embarked upon a professional boxing career.

During his medical, he was found to have two perforated eardrums. The fact that he was able to box at the level he had without it affecting his performance was notable.

After undergoing surgery, Haider made his professional debut defeating Buster Dennis via points at York Hall on the undercard of Merdud Takaloo's WBU light-middleweight title defence against Jose Rosa Gomez.

Haider went on to beat both Jason Nesbitt and Jus Wallie via points in his debut year as a professional boxer.

However, he was not able to keep his early success going and lost his fourth fight against Stevie Bell via points.

In 2005, Haider knocked undefeated prospect and 2002 Commonweight Games lightweight gold medallist Jamie Arthur out via a clash of heads.

Post-fight career 
Following his retirement, Haider coached boxing within the UK for over 10 years and is currently the boxing coach at Energie Fitness in Wembley, UK.

Professional boxing record

References

External links 
 Pro record
 
 Fiery Ali ready to deliver
 Determined Ali makes untimely comeback bid
 

1979 births
Living people
Pakistani male boxers
Olympic boxers of Pakistan
Boxers at the 2000 Summer Olympics
Commonwealth Games gold medallists for Pakistan
Commonwealth Games medallists in boxing
Boxers at the 2002 Commonwealth Games
Asian Games medalists in boxing
Asian Games bronze medalists for Pakistan
Boxers at the 1998 Asian Games
Medalists at the 1998 Asian Games
Hazara sportspeople
Sportspeople from Quetta
Recipients of the Pride of Performance
South Asian Games gold medalists for Pakistan
Featherweight boxers
South Asian Games medalists in boxing
Medallists at the 2002 Commonwealth Games